Moinul Islam Khan is a Bangladesh Nationalist Party politician and a former Jatiya Sangsad member representing the Manikganj-4 constituency.

Career
Khan was elected to parliament from Manikganj-4 (now defunct) as a Bangladesh Nationalist Party candidate in May 2006.

References

Living people
Bangladesh Nationalist Party politicians
8th Jatiya Sangsad members
Year of birth missing (living people)
Place of birth missing (living people)